Clear Creek Township or Clearcreek Township may refer to:

Arkansas
 Clear Creek Township, Drew County, Arkansas, in Drew County, Arkansas
 Clear Creek Township, Hot Spring County, Arkansas, in Hot Spring County, Arkansas
 Clear Creek Township, Sevier County, Arkansas, in Sevier County, Arkansas

Indiana
 Clear Creek Township, Huntington County, Indiana
 Clear Creek Township, Monroe County, Indiana

Iowa
 Clear Creek Township, Jasper County, Iowa
 Clear Creek Township, Johnson County, Iowa
 Clear Creek Township, Keokuk County, Iowa

Kansas
 Clear Creek Township, Ellsworth County, Kansas
 Clear Creek Township, Marion County, Kansas
 Clear Creek Township, Nemaha County, Kansas, in Nemaha County, Kansas
 Clear Creek Township, Pottawatomie County, Kansas, in Pottawatomie County, Kansas
 Clear Creek Township, Stafford County, Kansas, in Stafford County, Kansas

Missouri
 Clear Creek Township, Cooper County, Missouri
 Clear Creek Township, Vernon County, Missouri

Nebraska
 Clear Creek Township, Saunders County, Nebraska

North Carolina
 Clear Creek Township, Henderson County, North Carolina, in Henderson County, North Carolina

Ohio
 Clear Creek Township, Ashland County, Ohio
 Clearcreek Township, Warren County, Ohio
 Clearcreek Township, Fairfield County, Ohio

Township name disambiguation pages